List of the new National Highway numbers (state-wise).

Andhra Pradesh

Arunachal Pradesh

Assam

Bihar

Chhattisgarh

Goa

Gujarat

Haryana

Himachal Pradesh

Jharkhand

Karnataka

Kerala

Madhya Pradesh

Maharashtra

Manipur

Mizoram

Meghalaya

Nagaland

Odisha

Punjab

Rajasthan

Sikkim

Tamil Nadu

Telangana

Tripura

Uttar Pradesh

Uttarakhand

West Bengal

See also
 List of National Highways in India
 List of National Highways in India by state (old numbering)
 List of National Highways in India by union territory

References

External links
 New NH Notification
 OSM NH list

National highways in India
National Highways

Andhra Pradesh 

{{Routelist row
|country=IND
|type=NH
|route=516C
|length_km=12.7

Arunachal Pradesh

Assam

Bihar

Chhattisgarh

Goa

Gujarat

Haryana

Himachal Pradesh

Jharkhand

Karnataka

Kerala

Madhya Pradesh

Maharashtra

Manipur

Mizoram

Meghalaya

Nagaland

Odisha

Punjab

Rajasthan

Sikkim

Tamil Nadu

Telangana

Tripura

Uttar Pradesh

Uttarakhand

West Bengal

See also
 List of National Highways in India
 List of National Highways in India by state (old numbering)
 List of National Highways in India by union territory

References

External links
 New NH Notification
 OSM NH list

National highways in India
National Highways